The Shire of West Arthur is a local government area in the Wheatbelt region of Western Australia, generally to the west of Albany Highway about  south-east of Perth, the state capital. Industries within the Shire, worth approximately $45 million per year to the State's economy, are dominated by wool and sheep, and also include timber, grain, forestry, beef, pigs, cattle hide tanning, engineering and earthmoving.

History
The West Arthur Road District was created on 10 January 1896. On 1 July 1961, it became the Shire of West Arthur under the Local Government Act 1960, which reformed all remaining road districts into shires. The name relates to its position with respect to the former Arthur Road District, which was renamed to Wagin in 1905.

Wards
The ward system was discontinued on 20 October 2007 and all nine councillors represent the entire shire.

Previously, the shire was divided into four wards:

 North West (three councillors)
 North East (two councillors)
 South East (two councillors)
 South West (two councillors)

Towns and localities
The towns and localities of the Shire of West Arthur with population and size figures based on the most recent Australian census:

Former towns
 Boolading

Population

Heritage-listed places

As of 2023, 60 places are heritage-listed in the Shire of West Arthur, of which three are on the State Register of Heritage Places.

References

External links
 

West Arthur